Medicine Hat Transit is the municipal public transportation system operated by Medicine Hat, a small city in southeastern Alberta, Canada. Service is available and accessible to all residents of the community, including specialized transit for persons with disabilities; all of the MHT fleet is fully wheelchair-accessible.

History
In the 1950s local bus service was provided by Blair's Bus Lines, which was superseded by Medicine Hat Transportation Company, until 1972, when city-owned Medicine Hat Transit commenced operation of the current system. Starting in October 2008 Medicine Hat Transit began a transformation, with new routes and schedules and a fleet makeover and rebranding.

Services
Peak-service bus routes are scheduled to operate on weekdays between 6:45 am and 6:45 pm. Non-peak routes extend operations until 10:45 pm on weekdays and all day Saturday, with Sunday service 8:15 am– 7:15pm & holiday service provided between 10:15 am and 6:15 pm.

Specialized paratransit is available for people who can't use regular transit, a service for which they must be registered. Hours of operation are Monday to Saturday between 6:45 a.m. and 7:00 p.m. and all trips must be booked the day before.

Routes
This following service is in effect from Monday – Friday, 6:45 am – 6:45 pm except Holidays, on what Medicine Hat Transit defines as peak service.

10 Northeast Crescent Heights
11 Northwest Crescent Heights
20 Flats
21 Hospital
22 South Hill
31 Dunmore Road
40/41 College
50/51 Ross Glen
60 South Ridge
62 Southlands

Service becomes more limited during the non-peak, which is defined as the following times:
Monday – Friday 6:45 pm – 10:45 pm
Saturday 6:45 am – 10:45 pm
Sundays -8:15 am – 7:15pm 
Holidays 10:15 am – 6:15 pm

10 Northeast Crescent Heights
11 Northwest Crescent Heights
20 Flats
21 Hospital
22 South Hill
30 Dunmore Road
53 Ross Glen
61 South Ridge

See also

 Public transport in Canada

References

External links
City of Medicine Hat Transit information
Kevin's Bus and Rail Page - Medicine Hat Transit Photos

Transit agencies in Alberta
Medicine Hat